Russell Carr is a British car designer and was appointed head of design of Lotus Cars in 2014.

Career
Russell studied Industrial Design transportation at Coventry Polytechnic, graduating in 1988. He started work at the Coventry-based MGA Developments before he joined Lotus in 1990 and worked on a number of projects before being appointed head of design in November 2014, replacing Donato Coco. When the Chinese Geely acquired Lotus in 2017, Carr remained in charge of sports car design, but reporting to Peter Horbury, who he previously worked with in the late 1980s at MGA.

Designs

Lotus Esprit facelift
Lotus Europa S
Lotus Evija
Lotus Emira
Lotus Evora

References

British automobile designers
Living people
Lotus Cars
Alumni of Coventry University
Year of birth missing (living people)